Stories I Could Tell is the only album by American country music singer Shane Stockton (Kelly Brooks). It was released in June 1998 by Decca Records. The album includes the singles "What If I'm Right" and "Gonna Have to Fall".

Critical reception

Jon Weisberger of Country Standard Time said the songs had "too many solid melodies and arrangements betrayed by awkward, uninspired lyrics." Jana Pendragon of Allmusic rated the album two stars out of five, writing “As for depth beyond the heartbreaking kind, Stockton's songwriting shows an interesting bent on "Geronimo." As for foundation, it sounds as if Stockton knows where country music comes from, as he exhibits on "My Life's an Open Book," a pleasant waltz; "Billy Saw the Light" is just as good. Sadly, there are just too many other guys out there doing the very same thing.”

Track listing
All songs written by Shane Stockton; "I Didn't Know" co-written by Dave Stephenson and Mark Wright.
"Somewhere in the Ashes"  - 3:52
"What If I'm Right" - 3:04
"I Didn't Know" - 3:26
"Don't Let the Fool Fool You" - 2:57
"Gonna Have to Fall" - 3:10
"Train, Train" - 4:21
"Geronimo" - 3:52
"Stories I Could Tell" - 3:49
"My Life's an Open Book" - 3:25
"Billy Saw the Light" - 3:09

Personnel
 Chad Cromwell - drums
 Linda Davis - background vocals
 Pat Flynn - acoustic guitar
 Larry Franklin - fiddle, mandolin
 David Hungate - bass guitar, upright bass
 Carl Jackson - background vocals
 B. James Lowry - 8-string guitar, acoustic guitar, electric guitar
 Liana Manis - background vocals
 Brent Mason - acoustic guitar, electric guitar
 Nashville String Machine - strings
 Michael Omartian - string arrangements
 Al Perkins - dobro, steel guitar
 Matt Rollings - Hammond organ, piano
 John Wesley Ryles - background vocals
 Gary Smith - Hammond organ
 Harry Stinson - background vocals
 Shane Stockton - acoustic guitar, lead vocals, background vocals
 Danea Mitchell Wallace - background vocals

Singles

References

1998 debut albums
Decca Records albums
Shane Stockton albums
Albums produced by Mark Wright (record producer)